Víctor Reymundo Nájera Medina (born 4 July 1955) is a Mexican politician affiliated with the PRD. He currently serves as Deputy of the LXII Legislature of the Mexican Congress representing Morelos.

References

1955 births
Living people
Party of the Democratic Revolution politicians
21st-century Mexican politicians
Universidad Veracruzana alumni
Academic staff of Universidad Autónoma del Estado de Morelos
Members of the Congress of Morelos
Politicians from Morelos
People from Ciudad Ayala, Morelos
Deputies of the LXII Legislature of Mexico
Members of the Chamber of Deputies (Mexico) for Morelos